Hassan Hamza (Arabic:حسن حمزة) (born 10 November 1994) is an Emirati footballer who currently plays as a goalkeeper for Shabab Al-Ahli.

References

External links
 
 
 

Emirati footballers
1994 births
Living people
Al Shabab Al Arabi Club Dubai players
Shabab Al-Ahli Club players
Footballers at the 2014 Asian Games
UAE Pro League players
Association football goalkeepers
Asian Games competitors for the United Arab Emirates